Beverley Rae Clarkson is a New Zealand botanist, ecologist and wetland researcher and conservationist. She is best known for her research into and her conservation work with New Zealand wetlands. In 2021, the city of Hamilton awarded her the Hamilton-Kirikiroa Medal. In the same year Clarkson was awarded the New Zealand conservation award, the Loder Cup.

Early life and education
Clarkson's interest in botany was sparked and supported by her parents with both her mother and father teaching her about botany, taking her on trips into the bush to study and collect plants. She obtained a Bachelor of Science in 1974 from the University of Waikato. She then attended the Christchurch College of Education, earning a Diploma in Education in 1977. She subsequently returned to the University of Waikato, obtaining a Masters of Science in 1980 and a PhD in 2005. Her doctoral thesis was titled Restiad bog development and nutrient dynamics of the dominant species.

Botany and conservation work 
Clarkson works for Manaaki Whenua – Landcare Research as a senior researcher in plant ecology. While working with Manaaki Whenua she established the New Zealand National Wetland Database which facilitates research into New Zealand wetlands. Clarkson is also an honorary lecturer at the University of Waikato. 

Clarkson is a member and has served on the committee of the New Zealand Botanical Society. She is also a member of the Waikato Conservation Board, the International Mire Conservation Group and the International Society of Wetland Scientists. She is a member and a founding trustee of the National Wetland Trust.

Conservation activism 
Clarkson is a nationally renowned and vocal advocate for the conservation of New Zealand's wetlands. With the National Wetland Trust, she educates and raises public awareness about New Zealand wetlands through field days, restoration projects, meetings and conferences, as well as providing policy advice to both local and central government. She counts as one of her main achievements the inclusion of her research on wetlands into the 2020 document outlining the Labour Government’s Essential Freshwater Reforms.

Botanical writing 
She is a prolific researcher and writer of scientific journal articles and has compiled the handbook on the restoration of New Zealand wetlands. She also edited the New Zealand Botanical Society newsletter. She collects botanical specimens, some of which are held at Te Papa.

Awards
In 2020, Clarkson received the Kudos Lifetime Achievement Award. In 2021 Clarkson was awarded the Hamilton-Kirikiroa Medal by the city of Hamilton. This award recognised her work as an internationally renowned scientist, ecologist and conservationist. Also in 2021 Clarkson was awarded the Loder Cup, a national conservation award. This award was presented to Clarkson in April 2022.

Family 
Clarkson is married to botanist and academic Bruce D. Clarkson.

Selected works

References

20th-century New Zealand women scientists
Living people
Academic staff of the University of Waikato
Year of birth missing (living people)
New Zealand women botanists
University of Waikato alumni
20th-century New Zealand botanists
21st-century New Zealand botanists